Enteromius stanleyi is a species of ray-finned fish in the genus Enteromius which is endemic to the Congo River system in the Democratic Republic of the Congo.

The fish was named in the memory of Henry Morton Stanley (1841-1904), “du grand explorateur” of the Congo River Basin.

Footnotes 

 

Enteromius
Taxa named by Max Poll
Taxa named by Jean-Pierre Gosse 
Fish described in 1974
Endemic fauna of the Democratic Republic of the Congo